Allen West may refer to:

 Allen West (musician) (born 1967), American guitarist 
 Allen West (politician) (born 1961), American military officer and politician
 Allen West (prisoner) (1929–1978), American convicted criminal
 Allen West (tennis) (1872–1952), American Olympic tennis player

See also
 Al West (alias Sonny Boy; 1929–1950), lightweight professional boxer
 Alan West (disambiguation)
 Allen–West House, Barrington, Rhode Island
 Allen Weston, pen name of American author Andre Norton (1912–2005)
 Allens West railway station